Philbert Aimé Mbabazi Sharangabo (born 1990), is a Rwandan filmmaker. He has made several critically acclaim short films including, The Liberators, Versus and I Got My Things And Left.

Personal life
Philbert Aimé Mbabazi was born in 1990 in Kigali, Rwanda.

Career
Mbabazi obtained his B.A in cinema department from Geneva University of Art and Design (HEAD – Genève, Haute école d'art et de design) in Geneva. During school times, he made two films The Liberators and Versus. Both films were screened in several film festivals including Vision du Réel Nyon, Internationale Kurzfilmtage Winterthur, Tampere, Oberhausen and Uppsala Short Film Festival. After graduating in 2017, he returned to Rwanda.

In 2019, he directed the short film I Got My Things And Left which won the Grand Prize at the Oberhausen International Short Film Festival. The film has screened at more than 20 film festivals such Rotterdam International Film Festival, Internationale Kurzfilmtage Winterthur, Go Short Nijmegen, Indie Lisboa and ISFF Hamburg, FIFF Namur etc.

He started the film production company called 'Imitana Productions' based in Kigali, Rwanda. He later made his maiden feature film Republika (Spectrum).

Filmography

References

External links
 

Living people
1990 births
Swiss film directors
Rwandan film directors
Rwandan film producers